Anthostoma is a genus of fungi in the family Diatrypaceae.

References

Xylariales